.ooo ("triple-O") is a top-level domain (TLD) in the Domain Name System of the Internet. It was launched and is operated by Infibeam.

References

Top-level domains
Computer-related introductions in 2014